Odinist: The Destruction of Reason by Illumination is the sixth album by French avant-garde black metal band Blut Aus Nord. The album's subtitle comes from the writings of Aleister Crowley.

Track listing
"Intro" - 1:30
"An Element Of Flesh" - 5:31
"The Sounds Of The Universe" - 5:27
"Odinist" - 5:02
"A Few Shreds Of Thoughts" - 4:52
"Ellipsis" - 3:07
"Mystic Absolu" - 4:31
"The Cycle Of The Cycles" - 5:19
"Outro" - 1:39

Personnel
Vindsval - vocals, electric guitar
GhÖst - bass guitar
W.D. Feld - keyboards, drums, percussion

Additional Personnel
David Cragné - artwork

2007 albums
Blut Aus Nord albums